Haqdaar is a 1981 Indian Hindi-language film directed by S.K.Luthra, starring Rakesh Roshan, Suresh Oberoi and Yogeeta Bali.

Cast
Rakesh Roshan
Suresh Oberoi
Yogeeta Bali

Soundtrack
Lyrics: Rajendra Krishan

References

External links

Films scored by Kalyanji Anandji
1981 films
1990s Hindi-language films
1980s Hindi-language films